Anastasia Belova (born 31 January 1981) is a Russian former competitive ice dancer. Competing with Maxim Staviski, she placed ninth at the 1996 World Junior Championships in Brisbane, Australia. With later partner Ilia Isaev, she won bronze medals at the 2000 Skate Israel, 2001 Nebelhorn Trophy, and 2002 Nebelhorn Trophy.

Competitive highlights

With Isaev

With Staviski

References

External links 
 

1981 births
Russian female ice dancers
Living people
Competitors at the 2001 Winter Universiade